Trevor Strydom (born 9 January 1958) is a South African fencer and modern pentathlete. He competed at the 1992 Summer Olympics.

References

External links
 

1958 births
Living people
South African male épée fencers
South African male modern pentathletes
Olympic fencers of South Africa
Olympic modern pentathletes of South Africa
Fencers at the 1992 Summer Olympics
Modern pentathletes at the 1992 Summer Olympics
20th-century South African people